A. cylindrica may refer to:

Abida cylindrica, a land snail species
Acacia cylindrica, a flowering plant species
Aegilops cylindrica, a grass species
Afotella cylindrica, a moth species
Atimura cylindrica, a beetle species
Amastra cylindrica, a land snail species
Anemone cylindrica, a flowering plant species
Apriona cylindrica, a beetle species

Synonyms
Achillea cylindrica, a synonym of Achillea nobilis, a flowering plant species